Bogislav IX (1407/1410 – 7 December 1446), commonly known in English as Bogislav IX, was a duke of Pomerania in Pomerania-Stolp, whose residence was Stargard.  His first cousin Eric of Pomerania tried in vain to have him recognized as his heir to the Kalmar Union.

Bogislav was the son of Bogislav VIII, Duke of Pomerania, and Sophia of Holstein. On 24 June 1432, in Poznan, he married Maria of Masovia, daughter of Siemowit IV, Duke of Masovia and Alexandra of Lithuania. They had daughters, Sophia, who married Eric II, Duke of Pomerania, and Alexandra, and at least one of unknown name.

During the Polish–Teutonic War (1431–1435), Bogislav opposed the Teutonic Knights and supported the Kingdom of Poland. He was later involved in struggles related to Pomeranian bishops.

Bogislav IX was succeeded by his first cousin, Eric I.

References

Ancestors

See also
List of Pomeranian duchies and dukes
Pomerania during the Late Middle Ages
Duchy of Pomerania
Partitions of the Duchy of Pomerania
Pomerania-Stolp
House of Pomerania

15th-century births
1446 deaths
Dukes of Pomerania
Swedish princes